The 2006 Richmond Kickers season was the club's fourteenth season in existence. The club played in the USL Second Division, which represented the third-tier of American soccer.

This was the first season since 1996 that the Kickers played in the third division of American soccer. The season was noted for the Kickers winning a regular season and postseason championship. It was the Kickers' second ever league championship, and their first since 1995. It was also their second regular season championship, their first since 2001.

Non-competitive

Competitive

USL-2

USL-2 Playoffs

Semifinals

Final

U.S. Open Cup

Transfers

In

Out

Loan in

Loan out

References 

Richmond Kickers
2006
2006 in sports in Virginia